Putteridge is a suburb at the north-eastern edge of Luton, in the Borough of Luton, in the ceremonial county of Bedfordshire, England. Wigmore Lane and Hayling Drive form the southern boundary and Cannon Lane and Stapleford Road the western.

Local area 
Many of Putteridge's houses were built in the 1930s by Janes Builders of Luton. The area is home to one of Luton's cemeteries, The Vale. The University of Bedfordshire's Putteridge Bury Campus is just over the border in Hertfordshire. 

The area is surrounded by green space including Butterfield Green. Butterfield Green is a new industrial development currently being built. This is hoped to help boost the local economy of the area and Luton as a whole. 

Putteridge Primary School and Putteridge High School serve the local areas including Stopsley, Round Green and Wigmore.

Putteridge Bury

The house at Putteridge Bury was built in the style of Chequers by architects Sir Ernest George and Alfred Yeats and was completed in 1911.  The grounds were designed by Edwin L Lutyens with advice from Gertrude Jekyll.

Politics 
The area of Putteridge is part of the Stopsley and Wigmore wards, which form part of the parliamentary constituency of Luton South and the MP is Rachel Hopkins (Labour).

Local Attractions

Local newspapers
Two weekly newspapers cover Putteridge, although they are not specific to the area. 

They are the:
 Herald and Post
 Luton News

References 
James Dyer, The Stopsley Book, Book Castle, 1998,

External links
 Putteridge High School

Areas of Luton